Przemysław Niesiołowski (born 1974) is a Polish diplomat, since 2018 serving as Poland's ambassador to Lebanon.

Life 

Przemysław Niesiołowski was born in 1974. He was educated at the University of Warsaw, Faculty of African Studies. He holds a master's of business administration.

In 1998, he joined the Ministry of Foreign Affairs. Next year he became a member of OSCE mission in Kosovo, later he was the head of the UNDP office in Kosovo. From 2001, he worked at the Polish embassy in Lagos, Nigeria as Second and First Secretary. In 2004, after moving the embassy to Nigerian capital, Abuja, he became the Consul General in Lagos. In 2005, he returned to the MFA in Warsaw. Next year he became Counsellor and the deputy head at the embassy in Nairobi.

From 2009 to 2015, he held post of ambassador to Nigeria, accredited to Equatorial Guinea, Sierra Leone and Benin. Between 2015, and 2018 he was in positions of deputy director and director of the Department of Africa and the Middle East. Since February 2018 he serves as Poland ambassador to Lebanon.

He speaks English, French, Swahili and Russian languages.

References 

1974 births
Ambassadors of Poland to Lebanon
Ambassadors of Poland to Nigeria
Consuls-General of Poland
Living people
University of Warsaw alumni